Aliabad (also Romanized as ‘Alīābād) is a village in Jayezan Rural District, Jayezan District, Omidiyeh County, Khuzestan Province, Iran. At the 2006 census, its population was 143, in 30 families.

References 

Populated places in Omidiyeh County